Go Girls is a New Zealand comedy-drama television series that centres on four adult friends, three female and one male, living on Auckland's North Shore. In the fifth season it was the same premise, but this time centered on five adult friends, three female and two male. Dissatisfied with their lives, they make challenging promises to each other that they endeavour to fulfil throughout the series.

Episodes

Synopsis 
Go Girls began airing in New Zealand in February 2009. In June 2012 after the show's fourth season proved another ratings winner for its channel, Go Girls was signed on for a fifth season that began screening the following year. With many of the show's core cast (including Jay Ryan and Anna Hutchison) having departed for other roles, the fifth season featured an entirely new cast but a similar theme.

The show was created by Rachel Lang, who co-created the popular Outrageous Fortune television series, and Gavin Strawhan (Burying Brian). The two are responsible for the writing of the show, along with Kate McDermott.

The first episode screened in Australia on 8 August 2009.

Cast

Main
<onlyinclude>

Jay Ryan as Kevin (seasons 1–4)
Narrator of the show up until his departure half-way through season 4 and then again for the final few seconds of the original cast's run.  He's also the father of Britta's baby, Hero, but doesn't know it. He and Britta slept together (while he was engaged to Amanda) when they both thought that Olivia was going to die and wanted to comfort each other.  He ended up marrying Amanda in the last episode of season 3, but leaves her a year later after he realizes that they weren't compatible. Gets nearly beaten to death by Amanda's dad and brothers and ends up in the hospital.  While recovering, he "accidentally" has sex with Fran (she unknowingly ate pot laced muffins that amped up her sex drive and he was still partly in a body cast.) Amy forgives him though, since technically they weren't together at that point, and the two move forward with their relationship. Later gets offered a job as a mechanic for a rally car club when he helps out a man broken down on the side of the road.  Initially doesn't want to take it because it involved being away for several months, but Amy encourages him to go and they begin a long-distance relationship.  Tries to get back for Britta's wedding to Ross, but because of an airline strike, he doesn't make it in time but does eventually arrive to surprise Amy at the beach. Their kiss ends the show. 
Bronwyn Turei as Cody Latimer (seasons 1–4)
Mother of Possum. Manager/Owner Easy Tune auto repairs. Dating NSB/Nick.  
Alix Bushnell as Britta McMann (seasons 1–4)
Has an infant daughter named Hero. Owns The Party Fairy Company. Former barmaid and real estate agent. Married to Ross. 
Anna Hutchison as Amy Smart (seasons 1–2, 3–4)
Works at a law firm. Dating Kevin. Left during the beginning of Series 2 but returned at the end of Series 3.
Matt Whelan as Brad Caulfield (seasons 1, 2–4)
Recurring season one. Starring season 2+. Amy's ex who then married Angelina, though the two have now separated. He then dated Britta before the two broke up and he headed overseas. Is now running a bar on the North Shore. Is still in love with Britta.
Esther Stephens as Olivia Duff (seasons 2–4)
Runs a magazine with Leo. Married to Brad's brother Will.
George Mason as Ted Keegan (season 5)
Narrator of the show, makes a quest to make a name for himself. 
J.J. Fong as Alice Lee (season 5)
Determined not to be an Asian stereotype, Alice makes a quest to be bad.
Leon Wadham as Levi Hirsh (season 5)
Levi makes a quest for pay back.  
Shara Connolly as Candace "Candy" Fleetwood Mac McMann (seasons 1, 4 and 5)
Britta's younger sister. Has a brief fling with Kevin in season 1. Returns for Britta's wedding to Ross in season 4. Now in season 5, after realising she has alienated everyone she makes a quest to be a nicer person.
Tai Berdinner-Blades as Bennie Keegan (season 5)
Clumsy and unpractical, Bennie's quest to be her own boss.

Recurring cast

Production
Exterior shots of characters' homes are located in Mairangi Bay, Takapuna, Vauxhall and Cheltenham, North Shore respectively. The interior shots of the homes are constructed completely inside South Pacific Pictures' studio facilities on the North Shore.

The workshop 'Ezytune', where the characters Cody and Kevin work, is actually a Midas workshop located on Wairau Road in Glenfield, North Shore City. The show's producers acquire use of the workshop and simply place an 'Ezytune' sign over the existing Midas lettering during filming.

The bar frequented by the characters, 'The Taka', is a completely fictitious premises and was constructed within a studio. An enlarged photograph of the Hauraki Gulf, with volcano Rangitoto Island in the background, is used as the backdrop outside of the windows of the bar, this can be noticed in some scenes filmed on the bar's decking area.

Music
Continuing with co-producer Lang's theme throughout Outrageous Fortune of using only New Zealand music within the series, Go Girls features an array of New Zealand bands and artists.
The opening theme to the show "Piece of my Heart" by The Electric Confectionaires, was fittingly chosen as the band originate from the North Shore area.

As well as an eclectic mix of New Zealand songs throughout the season's episodes, a few set artists and songs were chosen to represent the show. The set score of the show most notably consists of music by three specific artists. Used in almost every episode to set mood, is music taken mostly from the New Zealand band, The Brunettes 2002 debut album, Holding Hands, Feeding Ducks. At least one song from this album can be found in every one of the 13 episodes of season one. A cover of the song "End of the Runway" from the album is sung by actress Alix Bushnell, who plays Britta McMann, in the final episode during characters Cody and Eli's wedding dance.

Another artist from the North Shore, Lydia Cole, features often with her song "Come With'", from her 2008 album Twenty Years.

The Electric Confectionaires song "Mr Whippy" is also used within the show.

Reviews

The show received mostly positive reviews upon airing.

The New Zealand Herald reviewer said about Go Girls: "It has not only restored my faith in television and womankind, but it made me laugh out loud in the process" and another reviewer from the same paper said "It looks good for a laugh provided by a set of appealing Shore girl characters.". The Sunday Star Times said "It's the scripts that make it - more productions of this calibre please"

However, not all reviews were positive with a reviewer for the Dominion Post newspaper saying Go Girls had "Bad overacting, no direction, lame dialogue and characters that don't ring true [has made for a] truly tedious hour of viewing".

American adaptation 
In October 2009 it was announced Go Girls would be adapted for U.S television by ABC. Liz Tuccillo, a writer on Sex and the City and the book and film He's Just Not That Into You. In November 2010 it was reported that the series is currently being developed by writer named Michael Oates Palmer (Army Wives, Kyle XY). The American version will be a loose adaption described as being about "a single man and his three single female friends, all in their early-mid 30s, trying to make relationships work in a major American city while all their other college friends are off starting families"

References

External links

TV review: Friends' chemistry enlivens Shore's answer to Westie icon
Go Girls leads new season TV schedule

2000s New Zealand television series
2010s New Zealand television series
2009 New Zealand television series debuts
2013 New Zealand television series endings
English-language television shows
New Zealand comedy-drama television series
Television shows filmed in New Zealand
Television shows funded by NZ on Air
Television shows set in Auckland
TVNZ 2 original programming
Television series by South Pacific Pictures
Television series by All3Media